Phillip Rebbeck (31 July 1948 – 29 September 2020) was an Australian cricketer. He played in five first-class and two List A matches for South Australia in 1971/72.

See also
 List of South Australian representative cricketers

References

External links
 

1948 births
2020 deaths
Australian cricketers
South Australia cricketers
Cricketers from Adelaide